Timoleon Raimondi (5 May 1827 – 27 September 1894) was the Last Prefect and First Vicar Apostolic of Hong Kong (17 November 1874).

Raimondi was born in Milan, Italy. He was the younger brother of Antonio Raimondi, a prominent naturalist who worked in Peru. Timoleon was ordained as a priest on 25 May 1850. He was appointed as prefect of Hong Kong in Hong Kong on 27 December 1868.

Raimondi was also:

 Titular Bishop of Achantus and Hong Kong – 4 October 1874
 Titular Bishop of Achantus – 22 November 1874

He died in Hong Kong on 27 September 1894.

Raimondi College in the Mid-Levels, Hong Kong Island was named after him.

References

Further reading

External links

 Bishop Timoleone Raimondi, M.E.M. 

1827 births
1894 deaths
Apostolic Vicars of Hong Kong
19th-century Italian Roman Catholic bishops
19th-century Roman Catholic bishops in China
Hong Kong people